Williams Landing is a suburb in Melbourne, Victoria, Australia,  south-west of Melbourne's Central Business District, located within the City of Wyndham local government area. Williams Landing recorded a population of 9,448 at the 2021 census.

Williams Landing is rapidly growing and will continue to grow rapidly in the next several years.

The first stage of Williams Landing, that of the Wyndham Waters estate along Sayers Road to the north of the suburb, adjacent to Truganina was developed first. The Williams Landing suburb development is forecast to continue development until 2030.

Williams Landing is being developed into a Transit-oriented development, major activity and employment centre. The suburb is next to the Williams Landing railway station, just across from the Princes Freeway and for residents of Point Cook, it is accessed via Palmers Road. Construction of Williams Landing commenced in early 2008 and is due to be completed by 2030.

Since the Williams Landing railway station opened in April 2013, and the shopping centre opened in December 2014, Williams Landing has been one of the most popular areas for home buyers. Median house value in Williams Landing has increased 37% from 2012 to 2014, second highest in Victoria. Williams Landing has continued its property growth, property prices in Williams Landing rose further 25.9% in the year, according to the latest data released in November 2015.

History

The major area of Williams Landing is what was once the RAAF Base Laverton airfield. The base is no longer used for operational flying but is still used for radio training. For administrative purposes, it is now merged with the former RAAF Base Point Cook, and is now known as RAAF Base Williams.

The developers of Williams Landing estate, Cedar Woods Properties Limited, worked to secure a new suburb name for the area prior to commencing development. The suburb was removed from the geographic boundaries of Laverton in 2008, with the name Williams Landing being gazetted in May 2008 and formalised by the Geographic Names Board in August.

Williams Landing estate

Background
Williams Landing is being developed by Cedar Woods Properties Limited and consists of a 50-hectare town centre and train station. The development is 275 hectares in area, and is located on the existing RAAF Base Laverton airfield, with major streets forming those of the previous runway alignment. The development is identified by the State Government of Victoria as a Priority Development Zone with a Major Activity Centre.

The development has a number of parks and environmental reserves, and includes the development of the Town Centre. Williams Landing railway station opened on 28 April 2013.

Neighbourhoods
The development contains five distinct areas, being four residential 'Neighbourhoods' and a Town Centre zone. Of the Residential Neighbourhoods, Ashcroft, Kingwell and Elmstead are fully delivered. The Addison Neighbourhood commenced development in 2015 and is expected to be complete in 2020. The Williams Landing development is marketed at premium buyers, with each Neighbourhood having alternate design guidelines to uphold a high quality level of build. Each Neighbourhood features wide streets, mature and significant landscaping and a large amount of open space to complement the upmarket scale of the homes built by residents.

Town Centre and Employment Precinct
Williams Landing's Neighbourhoods are complemented by the new town centre, proximity and direct access to the Princes Freeway, Williams Landing railway station, and a high level of connectivity with surrounding road infrastructure. There is a large level of amenity existing an planned for the town centre area, including a shopping centre and several completed office buildings and higher density residential uses, with a significant pipeline of development in future. The progressive development of Williams Landing will deliver a significant level of road infrastructure to the benefit of surrounding suburbs. According to the Star Weekly, proposed development in Williams Landing is expected to create about 13,000 white-collar jobs in the western suburbs over the next 15 years. The employment hub to include 5000 square metres of office space, a 50-room hotel and shops. Statistics show about 46.5 per cent of workers living in Point Cook and Williams Landing are university-qualified. Williams Landing Town Centre will create more jobs in the local area so they will no longer have to travel to Melbourne for work. Williams Landing has been identified within the Plan Melbourne strategy as a key 'activity centre,’ providing surrounding populations with retail and service amenity, as well as a commercial employment precinct. Its position allows for convenient commuting to and from the city, helping to ease issues associated with rapid population growth in Melbourne's west. According to a report prepared by economists, Williams Landing holds the potential to employ more than 23,000 people – the majority of these in white-collar fields – based on its strategic location within one of Australia's fastest growing municipalities, the City of Wyndham.

Notable tenants include Target Australia who signed an agreement for lease with Cedar Woods for a 12,860 square metre office building, consisting of eight levels and catering for 850 employees. The building is Target Australia's new headquarters and located in Williams Landing, the 225ha master-planned community in Melbourne's west.

Cedar Woods has secured a lease with the Victorian State Government for a new office building at Williams Landing, Victoria.

Tricare Aged Care is expanding its first project in Victoria, with 263 bed aged care facility in Williams Landing in 2 phases.

The town centre is also complemented by three apartment buildings. and two strata office buildings. The developers vision include more apartment living facilities and more strata offices in the pipeline.

Economic research to investigate Williams Landing's employment potential by Macroplan Dimasi found there is potential for 29,000 white-collar jobs to be created in Melbourne's west by 2031 under a low growth scenario.

Shopping Centre
Williams Landing Shopping Centre opened in December 2014. The shopping centre has a variety of specialist stores, a Woolworths supermarket, and fast food services. Williams Landing Shopping Centre also has office space available. has all the information for shoppers and for businesses wanting to lease. The Williams Landing shopping centre expanded in 2016. Construction commenced in March 2016 and was completed in September 2016. The expansion of the shopping centre features restaurants, a juice/café bar, a fitness gym and a childcare accommodating up to 100 children. Additional expansion is planned in the future.

Williams Landing Sporting Reserve
Williams Landing Boulevard Sporting Reserve is located in the heart of the Williams Landing estate surrounded by the residential areas and the Town Centre. Wyndham Council are constructing the sports reserve. This is currently under construction with stage one now complete. When stage two is complete, the reserve will feature 2x AFL/Cricket Ovals, 6 Tennis Courts, Shelters, Barbecue and Picnic Facilities, Playground, Fitness equipment and exercise area and Landscaping.

Greening The Pipeline initiative
The Greening the Pipeline initiative is a partnership between VicRoads, Wyndham City Council, City West Water and Greening the West. Under this initiative, Williams Landing has received a new community parkland along 100 metres of the Federation Trail reserve, between Lukis Avenue and McLachlan Drive. A launch event was held on 29 April 2017 for this park, with around 300 people enjoying the green open space.

This is an exciting first step for the Greening the Pipeline initiative, which has a long-term aim to transform the entire 27 kilometres of the heritage listed Main Outfall Sewer pipeline into parkland. The vision is to create a vibrant space that will connect communities and provide a unique space to meet, play and relax.

Criticism

School
The Williams Landing development does not include public schools. Opposition to this omission has been evident within the local community.

Sports reserve
Local residents have complained that the sports reserve does not meet the needs for the local community, and have complained that the previous term of Council has not consulted regarding its design.

Wyndham Waters estate

The Wyndham Waters estate was the first development in Williams Landing and was originally located overlapping the suburbs of Laverton and Truganina. The development features over 1000 households, and commenced in 2001, with the last stage completed in 2010. There is a recreation centre that provides residents of Wyndham Waters a gym, outdoor pool, tennis court, steam room and sauna.

History
The historic and now disused open outfall sewer reserve physically separates the Wyndham Waters development from the newer Williams Landing development, effectively creating two separate zones in the suburb. The land which Wyndham Waters was built on was very flat and was prone to flooding. The developers Urban Property Developments Pty. Ltd. (now Asset1) had built a large waterway to mitigate flooding in the development.

Clara estate
Clara estate is located in the northwestern corner of the suburb of Williams Landing, with 40 subdivision, next to the Wyndham Waters estate, according to the developer Cedar Woods, all of the lots were sold in FY2015 and 39 of these settled in the first quarter of FY2016.

Transport

Train
Williams Landing is a major transport hub for the City of Wyndham and surrounding suburbs. Williams Landing railway station is located at the south of the Williams Landing town centre and is served by the Werribee railway line.

Bus
Williams Landing is one of the main bus hubs in the City of Wyndham. Currently there are five bus routes connecting surrounding suburbs, activity and shopping centres.

List of Buses in Williams Landing
 150 - Williams Landing – Tarneit via Sayers Road
 151 - Williams Landing – Tarneit via Westmeadows Lane
 153 - Williams Landing – Werribee via Princes Highway
 494 - Williams Landing – Point Cook South via Alamanda Boulevard
 495 - Williams Landing – Point Cook South via Boardwalk Boulevard
 497 - Williams Landing – Saltwater Coast via Point Cook Road

Bicycle
Cycling is a popular way for locals and residents who live in surrounding suburbs to get to the new train station. The popularity is increasing because of the high demand for car parking space. As at February 2015, an estimate of 500 cyclists were on the waiting list for a secure bike cage.

Road Network
Williams Landing has direct to Princes Freeway and has extensive road network connecting nearing suburbs. The Victorian Government has invested $1.8 billion for a comprehensive program of road upgrades and maintenance the west, to cater for Melbourne's rapid growth.

The Western Roads Upgrade will transform eight priority roads in Melbourne's western suburbs, including:

 Dunnings Road and Palmers Road (Point Cook Road to Princes Freeway)
 Palmers Road (Princes Freeway to Western Freeway)
 Derrimut Road (Sayers Road to Dohertys Road)
 Leakes Road (Fitzgerald Road to Derrimut Road)
 Dohertys Road (Fitzgerald Road to Grieve Parade)
 Dohertys Road (Foundation Road to Palmers Road)
 Forsyth Road Interchange
 Duncans Road Interchange

The improve road connectivity will boost the productivity and employment in the region.

Local government

Williams Landing's local government area is the City of Wyndham, one of the fastest growing municipalities in Australia. The estimated population for the City of Wyndham in 2015 is around 201,012. It is forecasted its population will almost double, reach to around 384,275 in 2036.

Councillors

Williams Landing is within Harrison Ward, and the current councillors are:
 Cr Tony Hooper
 Cr Aaron An
 Cr Intaj Khan
 Cr Kim McAliney

Flora, fauna, waterways and reserves

There are many species of original vegetation of Williams Landing that have been present for thousands of years. The red coloured patches are either kangaroo grass or red-leg grass. In spring, common everlastings, blue devils, lemon beauty-heads and spur velleia come up and are also original flora to the area. The area also has some threatened species such as spiny rice-flowers, large-fruit fireweeds, and basalt podolepis.

Williams Landing estate

The major wetland at Williams Landing provides habitat for many birds, reptiles and frog species. The water level varies over the weather and the fauna responds similarly. Australasian bittern and other birds that migrate from Japan prefer more shallow water when wet grassy verges are available, whereas the black swan and Australasian shoveler like deeper water and are increasingly seen when water levels are high.

Wyndham Waters estate

Due to the waterway in Wyndham Waters, there are many types of birds around the area. Examples of these birds are shovelers, mallards, firetails, moorhens and scrubwrens.

References

External links
 Williams Landing developer's website
 Williams Landing community portal
 Williams Landing Community & Residents Facebook page
 Williams Landing Shopping Centre Website

Suburbs of Melbourne
Suburbs of the City of Wyndham